Tom Longworth was a 20th-century Anglican bishop.

He was born on 8 January 1891 and educated at Shrewsbury and University College, Oxford and  ordained in 1916. From 1927 to 1935 he was the Rector of Guisborough and then Benwell before his ordination to the episcopate as the second Bishop of Pontefract, with the additional title of Archdeacon of the area. Translated to Hereford in 1949 he retired in 1961 and died on 15 October 1977.

Notes

1891 births
People educated at Shrewsbury School
Alumni of University College, Oxford
Archdeacons of Pontefract
Bishops of Pontefract
Bishops of Hereford
1977 deaths
20th-century Church of England bishops